(modern spelling:  or ) is an Irish language female given name meaning "blue princess" or "illustrious princess".

 is also a Gaelic mythological personification of Ireland.

 is noted in early Irish texts as the name of several queens closely connected with dynastic politics in 10th- and 11th-century Ireland, and was one of the most popular Gaelic-Irish female forenames between the 8th and 16th century.

Bearers of the name

 , Queen of Tara, .
 , Queen of Tara, died 948.
 , Queen of Ireland, died 1030.
 , died 1063.
 , died 1076.
 , Princess of Kerry, died 1110.
 , Princess of Leinster, died 1112.
 , died 1127/1134.
 , died 1314.
 , Princess of Moylurg, died 1324.
 , died 1350.
 , Princess of Fermanagh, died 1352.
 , died 1432.
 , died 1437.
 , Princess of Leinster, died 1465.
 , died 1468.
 Gormfhlaith Ní Thuairisg, Craoltóir Raidió na Gaeltachta

See also
 List of Irish-language given names

External links
 http://medievalscotland.org/kmo/AnnalsIndex/Feminine/Gormlaith.shtml

Irish-language feminine given names